Arnošt Petráček (born 25 July 1991) is a Czech Paralympic swimmer who competes in international level events. He specialises in backstroke swimming where he has won one Paralympic title in 2016, one World title including three silvers and two European titles.

Career
In 2016, Petráček's portrait was minted onto Czech coins and was awarded these in Jablonec nad Nisou because of his success at the 2016 Summer Paralympics along with Lukáš Krpálek who won an Olympic gold in judo at the 2016 Summer Olympics. He was awarded the Medal of Merit for his services in the sport by mayor Jiří Svoboda.

References

1991 births
Living people
Sportspeople from Písek
Sportspeople from České Budějovice
Paralympic swimmers of the Czech Republic
Swimmers at the 2008 Summer Paralympics
Swimmers at the 2012 Summer Paralympics
Swimmers at the 2016 Summer Paralympics
Medalists at the 2016 Summer Paralympics
Medalists at the World Para Swimming Championships
Medalists at the World Para Swimming European Championships
Recipients of Medal of Merit (Czech Republic)
Czech male freestyle swimmers
S4-classified Paralympic swimmers